Sophie Cundale (born 1987) is an artist living and working in London. In 2016, Serpentine Galleries commissioned her film After Picasso, God. In 2020, South London Gallery exhibited her solo show The Near Room, which received reviews in The Guardian and Time Out.

References

1987 births
21st-century British artists
Alumni of the Slade School of Fine Art
Living people
British women artists